Cuming may refer to:

People with the surname
 Sir Alexander Cuming (1691–1775), Scottish adventurer, chief of the Cherokees
 Frederick Cuming (cricketer), English cricketer
 Frederick Cuming (artist), British painter
 Hugh Cuming, English collector
 Thomas B. Cuming, American politician
 Walter Comyn, Lord of Badenoch, also known as Walter Cuming

Places
 Cuming County, Nebraska
 Cuming Inlet, Nunavut, Canada
 Cuming Museum, within the London Borough of Southwark
 Cuming Township, Cuming County, Nebraska
 Cuming Township, Dodge County, Nebraska

Other uses
 Slang term for ejaculation

See also
 Cumings, Texas
 Cumming (disambiguation)
 Cummings (disambiguation)